The priestly covenant ( brith ha-kehuna) is the biblical covenant that God gave to Aaron and his descendants, the Aaronic priesthood, as found in the Hebrew Bible and Oral Torah.

The covenant is portrayed as everlasting and Halachically applicable notwithstanding the removal of the "five articles of honor" (see Jerusalem Talmud to Sotah 35b for the complete list) prior to the destruction of the First Temple, and most priestly duties, including Korban offerings- with the destruction of the Second Temple.

In the Torah, the covenant is cited as being compared to salt and is called "a covenant of salt forever"  (Hebrew brith melach olam ברית מלח עולם), or "a statute forever" (Hebrew chukat olam"). In Midrashic sources the priestly covenant is one of five everlasting covenants.

Hebrew Bible

Priests in Genesis
The first person listed in the Hebrew Bible as a "priest" (Hebrew kohen) is Melchizedek. Midrashic literature details that due to Melchizedek preceding the name of Abraham to God, the priesthood was taken from him and given to Abraham   who passed it on to his son Isaac who in turn passed it on to his son Jacob.

Jacob's deathbed blessing of Levi
Maimonides, in his Mishna Torah compilation, explains that Jacob separated his son Levi from his other sons and appointed him to instruct and teach the ways of service to God, specifically the methods used by his forefather Abraham, to his brothers.  He also instructed his sons to perpetuate this status of the tribe of Levi for eternity (Maimonides, On Idolatry 1:15). For the prelude of this choice see Targum Jonathan to Genesis 32:25, and Pirkei de-Rabbi Eliezer ch. 37. In midrash it is written that Amram the son of Kohath the son of Levi was the spiritual leader of the sons of Jacob during their Egyptian Bondage.  Following his death, his post was assumed by his firstborn Aaron.

Exodus
At the time of the erection of the Tabernacle, God commanded Moses to appoint Aaron and his sons to the priestly service as a precondition to God revealing his shechinah glory amongst the nation of Israel;

With the appearance that Aaron -by his own right- was worthy of the privilege of priesthood, the midrash clarifies that in fact it was due to the support and guidance of Moshe that afforded him the necessary qualifications for the Kohanic duties.

The priestly duties prior to Aaron
Prior to the appointing of Aaron and his sons to function as priests it was customary amongst the congregation of Israel that, just as all professions attract certain character types who excel therein, the duty of priesthood was best served by the firstborn of each household.  As it is the firstborn who is, by nature, inclined and qualified to be an "emissary of the congregation" in the eyes of God. According to the Targum Yosef to Books of Chronicles, individuals from the Tribe of Reuben (the firstborn of Jacob) where leading as the High priest, up until the establishment of Aaron to the same (Targum Joseph to Books of Chronicles 1 5:1-2).

The Golden Calf, and sin of the firstborn
Based on Hebrew Bible narrative, the consequence of the sin of the golden calf was the desire by God to annihilate the entire congregation.  It was due to the successful prayer of Moses and the retribution meted out by the tribe of Levi from the inciters of the sin that appeased the anger of God. Obadiah ben Jacob Sforno on Deuteronomy 10:8 writes that Moses attempted to convince God that the priesthood should remain with the firstborn but was not successful.

However, the negative consequence of arousing God's anger was that no longer would the priestly service be maintained by the firstborn of each individual family. As quoted by the Jerusalemn Talmud Yerushalmi to Esther 1:11; "Said Rabbi Levi, "God broke the staff of evildoers (Isaiah 14)" - these are the firstborn who sacrificed to the Calf first (and foremost)", but will be concentrated in one family as a form of inheritance from father to son.

According to Nachmanides and other Torah commentators, the decision to appoint Aaron and his sons to priestly duty was a unilateral act of God, without the agreement or disagreement being asked of the congregation.

This decision was not readily accepted by the large majority of the congregation of Israel, and quickly enough began the rebellion led by Korah and followed by the leaders of the tribe of Reuben.  Indeed, so powerful was the rebellion that even after the divine punishment of Korah and his followers, other came forth who further demonstrated disagreement and likewise met with divine retribution until saved by Aaron himself, who arrested the plague.

Shlomo Ephraim Luntschitz writes that the priesthood was taken from Reuben due to his sinning against his father Jacob.

Based on the Talmudic rule that "God and heaven give goodness but do not retract it once given" (Zohar Chadash to Ruth) it is explained that the priesthood was never bestowed by God and Heaven to the Bechorim but it was the decision of man to appoint the firstborn to those duties, it is thus applicable that God himself could choose who amongst his creatures are most fitting in his eyes for the priestly service.

The firstborn (bechorim) retain their sanctity

Albeit the sin of idolatry (Hebrew avodah zarah) committed by the firstborns,bechorim, according to some rabbinical commentators it is clear from the Torah that the firstborn still retained their sanctity.  According to Midrash Rabba this is based on the firstborn being referred to by God by the term "to me" (Hebrew לי). The Midrash Rabba states that all five places where the word "to me" (לי) is mentioned (in context with God speaking), stays sanctified forever, both in this world and the next.  Of the firstborn it is written "to me all firstborn" (Hebrew לי כל בכור; Medrash rabbah to Leviticus 2:2).  The commentators to the midrash point out that even though the firstborn where disqualified from priestly duties, their sanctity was not canceled since they still retain the need to be redeemed from their sanctified state at birth. In addition, there are some Torah commentarians that explain the firstborn retains a state of sanctity in terms that it is required of him, even after being redeemed, to be more knowleadgable in Torah law and nuances than the average Jew, and to be diligent in engaging in Torah study.

God's reason for choosing Aaron
Jewish commentaries on the Bible give various reasons to the logic behind the divine choice of Aharon and his sons for the priesthood.

Hezekiah ben Manoah explained that it was the desire of God that the priesthood rest with one specific family in order that the father of the household instill in his children the duties of the priesthood, and have his children exposed to those ideas, as a family way of life, from birth and throughout life, in order to be successful at their priestly duties.  This not being the case with the firstborn (as each family could produce only one firstborn) as it is likely that the father of the firstborn not be a firstborn himself, making his knowledge of priesthood minimal and thus not being able to teach priesthood to his child.

Maimonides explained that Levi (grandfather of Aaron, was already chosen and sanctified by Jacob himself to service in duties relating to priesthood, and Aaron's appointment being a divine affirmation of Jacob's choice.

David Pardo explained that in Tosefta it is explained that selectively choosing one group of servants to the King (God) exemplifies and portrays the grandeur of the King by showing that not all could merely "show up" and begin serving.

The Jerusalem Targum attributes the choosing of Aaron due to the meritorious actions of Jochebed, who saved the male Jewish infants from the infanticide decree laid forth by Pharaoh (Jerusalem Targum to Exodus 2:21).  The Medrash Rabbah explains that since Kehoth, the son of Levi, merited to carry the Ark of the Covenant and Aaron himself being the firstborn from amongst his grandchildren, thus Aaron merited the priesthood along with the title "Holy of Holys" (1 Chronicles 23:13) by way of patrilineal inheritance (Bamidbar Rabbah 6:2).  From a more abstract Kabbalah point of view, there are some Torah commentarians, such as Elazar Shach, that explain the priesthood as belonging to Aaron from the six days of creation.

Obadiah ben Jacob Sforno, on the verse "and to stand before the congregation and serve them" comments that one of the reasons for God's choosing of the tribe of Levi in general was to cause envy to the congregation for partaking in the sin of the Golden Calf.

In the written Torah
The written Law (Torah SheBichtav) which Maimonides called the "everlasting Torah" forbids "the foreigner who is not from the offspring of Aaron" to offer the Ketoret offering on the inner altar of burnt offering.  The Law also instructs the children of Aaron to scrupulously guard the sanctity of the altar and not allow a foreigner from bringing an offering thereon (Numbers 18:7), and describes the priestly covenant as an "eternal covenant."

In the book of Malachi, a prophetic vision is put forth portraying the sudden appearance of God in Jerusalem and the Temple, and his immediate busying with purifying his servants, the children of Levi;

The destruction of the Second Temple in Jerusalem, 70 CE
The destruction of Jerusalem by the army of Titus in 70 CE caused the cessation of animal sacrifices and other aspects of the priesthood's function in Judaism.

The cessation of the priesthood's work in the Second Temple

At the destruction of the First Temple, the Talmud narrates how the young priests went atop the Heichal with the keys to the Heichal in hand and called out "master of the universe, since we were not fortunate to be reliable caretakers, let the keys be given to you" upon completion they heaved the keys upward -towards heaven, when a hand came forth from heaven and took the keys.  Following, those young priests jumped into the inferno below.

Following this destruction of the temple, the arrest of priestly activities therein, along with the of the Davidic line, came forth verbatim from the masses that announced the God became disgusted with "the two family dynasties" -The houses of Aaron and David;

The Jewish priesthood in the Third Temple

Vision of Jeremiah
As a response to the verbatim that God permanently retracted his preference to these two dynasties, the prophet Jeremiah prophesied that the priesthood, as being the lot of Aaron, is everlasting and will not cease forever, and the priests will return to the priestly service with greater grandeur;

This vision, Jeremiah goes on to intertwine with the central existence of the nation of Israel; "if these covenants cease from before me, says God, so too the seed of Israel will cease to be a nation before me all of the days (Jeremiah 31:35).
The commentators point out that these particular visions of Jeremiah did not come forth in the days of the Second Temple, since therein the Davidic line was not established and the priesthood was not in a state of splendor, but the vision of Jeremiah is one destined for the priestly service in the Third Temple, and the kingdom of the king Messiah - as Jeremiah finishes; "than will rejoice the virgin in dance and young men and elders together.. and I will infatuate the souls of the priests with abundance and my nation; my best they will be satiated with (Jeremiah 31:12-13)".

The Third temple in Ezekiel
The prophet Ezekiel introduced a prophecy not recorded in any other book of the Hebrew Bible. Ezekiel writes that in the Third Temple the priestly family of the sons of Zadok will officiate all services involving the sacrifice of fats and blood on the altar.  They will also enjoy an exclusive chamber in the courtyard of the House from amongst the multiple chambers therein; specifically, their chamber will have its entrance facing the North whereas all others chamber entrances face South.  These privileges are cited as being given to the priests of the sons of Zadok due to their staunch non-involvement with any form of idol worship, while other families, including the priests, submitted to those forbidden services.

The Third temple in the Zohar
The Zohar Chadash describes the priesthood as one of five covenants listed in the Law (Zohar Chadash 4b), in the Aramaic Compendium on the Book of Exodus it is also listed as one of six unique blessings that God is destined to return to the nation of Israel. According to Sifra it is likewise listed as one of five items that God calls "to me" (Hebrew לי) a term that connotes an eternal choice as God himself is eternal (Sifri 167a). Sifra teaches that following the coming of the Messiah, Aaron and his sons will not require holy anointing oil to serve as the anointing done by Moses in the Tabernacle will be considered as being in effect (Sifra 1.343).

The Sifra and Talmud Yerushalmi explain that it is not applicable to say that just as the priesthood was removed from the priesthood and given to Aaron it is possible, in the future, that it will be removed from Aaron and returned to the firstborn, but the priesthood is and will remain the lot of Aaron and his sons for eternity.
The Babylonian Talmud presents that the eternity of the priesthood belonging to Aaron is exemplified by the notion that Ahron himself will be present to accept terumah following the coming of the Messiah.

The Tosefta narrates that at the time of the concealment of the Ark of the Covenant, the Aaron's rod, with its flowering almond sprouts, was included, thus symbolizing the flowering of Aaron's priesthood once the Ark will be revealed.
In addition to the title "an eternal covenant of priesthood," the tractate Animal Sacrifices explains that when God contributes an authoritative position to an individual it is for eternity.  Furthering the notion that it is not plausible that the priesthood will be revoked from the tribe of Levi as it was revoked from the firstborn.

The Third Temple in Torah Commentaries
Jacob ben Asher on the threefold repetition of the words "and they will serve me" explains this as symbolic that the priests will in the future serve a third time, in the Third Temple. He also opines that the priesthood will not return to Aaron's sons in the Messianic age.

The aggadic compilation Yalkut Shimoni relates an occurrence where a Kritis queries Rabbi Yossi as to the destruction of the second temple and cessation of sacrifices (Korbanot) which seemingly disprove the words of the prophet Jeremiah describing the Kohanim of serving God "all of the days".  Rabbi Yossi replied that the prophetic vision of the Kohanim serving "all of the days" is in reference to the physical sacrifices in the temple, but to the Torah study by the Kohen of Torah Laws delving on the sacrifices (Mishnayot Kodoshim laws).

The priesthood in the Messianic era
With the priesthood being portrayed in the Hebrew Bible and Chazalic writings as being the eternal lot of the "Home of Aaron" (בית אהרן"), the written recordings of Rabbi Chaim Vital of his master Rabbi Yitzchok Luria (the Arizal) introduce an idea that in the Age to Come (Hebrew LeAtid Lavoh "the Messianic era") the souls belonging to the spiritual rootsource of Kayin, which are essentially the souls of the firstborn and Levites,  will become clear and purified and will thus merit to serve in the Third Temple. This idea is exegesized from the verse "אם תטיב שאת" (if you will better yourself you will be uplifted) explained as when you will better yourself you will merit to the priesthood which is titled "שאת" (uplifted).

This idea is echoed by Rabbi Schneur Zalman of Liadi in his book The Tanya, as by his son and successor The Mitteler Rebbe In Numbers col. 2 p. 976 the Rebbe brings the standard concept of Aaron and sons serving in the times of Messiah. And his successor, the third Lubavitch Rebbe, Menachem Mendel Schneersohn.

Likewise, Chaim ibn Attar in his commentary to Jacob's blessing to his son Reuben ("בכורי אתה"  you are my firstborn) writes that in the Age to Come the firstborn will work alongside the priests in the Third Temple Of note is Chaim ibn Attar's subsequent writing to Numbers 3:45, where he emphasizes that the tribe of Levi will eternally never be demoted from their duties.  The idea is further quoted by Ithamar HaKohen with the explanation that in the Age to Come the sin of the Golden Calf will be rectified thus allowing the firstborn to work alongside the priests in the Third Temple.  According to the commentary of Jonathan Eybeschutz on the Haphtorah the priests descending from Zadok will function as high priests, and the firstborn will function as standard priests.

Encompassing explanation
This seeming contradiction to numerous verses and chazalic discourses specifically detailing the service of the Aaron and his sons in the times of the Messiah was explained by Menachem Schneerson, the seventh Lubavitch Rebbe succeeding Rabbi Schneur Zalman, in his Holy Letters of the Rebbe.  There, Rabbi Schneerson explains that the future change as presented in Hasidic Judaism and Kabbalah will appear purely on a spiritual level, with the soul of the Levi (i.e. those souls stemming from the rootsource of Cain) being born into the physical bodies of the sons of Aaron. Thus, allowing the spiritual qualities of the Levi, in the days of the Messiah being of extra-fine character, to be housed in the body of the son of Aaron the Priest

See also
 613 Mitzvot
 Halacha l'Moshe m'Sinai

References

Priesthood (Judaism)
Book of Exodus
Jewish law and rituals
Covenants in the Hebrew Bible